Aleksander Kosiba (born 18 January 1901 in Libusza — died 18 September 1981 in Wrocław) was a Polish geographer, geophysicist, glaciologist and climatologist.

Kosiba's undergraduate tertiary studies were at the then Jan Kazimierz University.

He was an honorary member of Norwegian Geographical Society. Kosiba was involved in a Greenland expedition in 1934 by Denmark. There he worked for five months - May to September. In 1978 he published his last scientific work, "The snow, glaciers — ice sheets."

References

1901 births
1981 deaths
Polish climatologists
Polish geographers
Polish glaciologists
Polish geophysicists
20th-century geographers
People from Gorlice County